Heinrich Sack (10 December 1909 – 13 September 1941) was a German canoeist, born in Hamburg, who competed in the 1936 Summer Olympics.

In 1936 he finished fourth together with his partner Hans Wedemann in the C-2 1000 metre event. Sack was killed in action during World War II on the Eastern front in 1941. He is buried in a military cemetery in Kyiv.

References

External links

1909 births
1941 deaths
Sportspeople from Hamburg
Canoeists at the 1936 Summer Olympics
German male canoeists
Olympic canoeists of Germany
German military personnel killed in World War II
Military personnel from Hamburg